Wild Rapids Waterslide Park was located on the shores of Sylvan Lake in the resort town of Sylvan Lake, Alberta, Canada. Wild Rapids opened to the public in 1982, and it was Alberta's second-largest water park after the World Waterpark in West Edmonton Mall. Wild Rapids Waterslide was one of five waterslide parks in Alberta, and the last outdoor water park to operate until it closed in 2016. The park contained 12 slides, many small pools, three hot tubs, and a children's water playground. The park closed at the end of the 2016 season, after operating for 34 years. The park was located near Red Deer, between Edmonton and Calgary, along Alberta Highway 11A. Wild Rapids was the largest water park of its kind in western Canada.

History
Wild Rapids Waterslide was founded in 1982 by Dave Dubeta and Garry Johnson, and opened just in time for its first full summer of operations. Wild Rapids Water Slide was built on the land previously owned by the Johnson Family, known as Sandy Cove Campsite, which was next to the public pier. 

Thirty-four years later, it was announced that the park would close after the 2016 season, as it was being bought by the town of Sylvan Lake for redevelopment. The slides and equipment were put up for sale on Kijiji. The president of Bear Development Corporation, Bert Messier, hoped that an entrepreneur would see the advertisement, buy the equipment, and build another waterpark in Alberta. The children's playground was sold, and will now operate on the shores of Gull Lake.

Attractions

Slides
There were 12 main slides in the park, and one small water playground that contains other small slides for children. The slides were all white in colour, except for the playground slides. While facing the park from the entrance, there was a left tower, a middle tower, and a right tower.

Individual slides
These slides are all beginner class body slides.

Middle tower
These slides are all intermediate class. There are three body slides and one tube slide.

Left tower (River Rides)
These slides are all advanced class tube slides.

Right Tower
These slides are all extreme class. There is one tube slide and two mat slides.

Other attractions
Wild Rapids Waterslides also had three hot tubs and several small pools. There were also four concessions that had been renamed.

Concessions:
 Blizzard Beach ice cream
 Sliders Grill 
 Top Dogs (hot dogs)
 The Wedge pizza & subs

Gallery

See also

World Waterpark
List of water parks

References

External links
 Official website (Archived)

Water parks in Canada
1982 establishments in Alberta
Defunct amusement parks in Canada
2016 disestablishments in Alberta